The president of Cooper Union is the chief administrator of Cooper Union.

History
The Cooper Union for the Advancement of Science and Art was founded in 1859 by industrialist, inventor and philanthropist Peter Cooper. From its inception, the college committed to providing full scholarships, regardless of need, to its students.

List of presidents of the Cooper Union
 Peter Cooper (1859—1882)
 Edward Cooper (1882—1904)
 John Edward Parsons (1905—1914)
 Robert Fulton Cutting (1914—1934)
 Gano Dunn (1935—1951)
 Edwin S. Burdell (1951—1960)
 Johnson E. Fairchild (1960—1961) (Acting)
 Richard Franklin Humphreys (1961—1968)
 Henry Heald (1968—1969) (Acting)
 John F. White (1969—1979)
 Bill N. Lacy (1980—1987)
 John Jay Iselin (1988—2000)
 George Campbell Jr. (2000—2011)
 Jamshed Bharucha (2011—2015)
 William Mea (2015—2017) (Acting) 
 Laura Sparks (2017—present)

References

External links
Official Website

Cooper Union
Presidents